Maalim is a family name. It may refer to:

Given name
Maʽalim ʽAli ʽAden, Somali politician

Middle name
Hussein Maalim Mohamed, Kenyan politician of Somali origin
Mohamed Maalim Mohamud, Kenyan politician

Surname
Farah Maalim Mohamed, Kenyan politician, and an advocate of the High Court of Kenya. Former member of Parliament
Mahadhi Maalim (born 1972), Tanzanian politician and Member of Parliament 
Mahboub Maalim (born 1958), Kenyan diplomat of Somali origin